Antonio Hernández may refer to:
 Antonio Hernández (director), Spanish film director and screenwriter
 Antonio Hernández (cyclist), Mexican cyclist
 Antonio Hernández (footballer), Mexican footballer
 Antonio Hernández Gallegos, Mexican Roman Catholic bishop
 Antonio Hernández Mancha, Spanish politician
 Antonio Hernández Arriaga, Mexican professional wrestler, known as Espectro I
 Antonio Viana Hernandez, known as Anthony Alonzo, Filipino actor and singer

See also
 Tony Hernández, Honduran convicted drug trafficker and politician